A Friends meeting house is a meeting house of the Religious Society of Friends (Quakers).

Friends Meetinghouse may also refer to:
 Friends Meetinghouse (Wilmington, Delaware)
 Friends Meetinghouse (Uxbridge, Massachusetts)
 Friends Meetinghouse (Casco, Maine)
 Friends Meetinghouse (Dover, New Jersey)
 Friends Meetinghouse (Mount Pleasant, Ohio)
 Friends Meetinghouse (Jamestown, Rhode Island)